Sautperdu, or Saut-Perdu, ("wild-leap") is the warhorse of Malquiant, one of the Saracens in the French epic, The Song of Roland. Sautperdu is mentioned in laisse 120 of the poem.

References

Matter of France
Individual warhorses
Fictional horses